Kamalapur Town or sometimes Kamalapuram is a Mandal of Hanumakonda district in the state of Telangana in India.It is located nearer to town Warangal the city of kakatiyas.It is close to Kakatiya university.   

First finance minister of Telangana Shri Etela Rajender studied his school education here in Govt Boys High school, Kamalapur. kamalapur is educational hub and Government Hospital services for nearby towns and villages.  

Best known landmarks in this town are govt hospital, sub station, hp gas bottling plant road, chavadi, kothawada,  shivalayam main road, panugatla, Saradhi theatre, Uppal railway station 

kamalapur  is mainly an agricultural town. The main products are rice and cotton. In this town Ramalayam is on a large stone. It is 25km from  Hanumakonda district headquarters. 

A large lake lies to the west of town. Kamalapur lake is the biggest lake in this town and is going to become a reservoir. The nearest railway station is Uppal (opl).

Transport

Roadway 
Kamalapur is very well connected with road.  Mancherial , jammikunta, huzurabad, parkal buses passes through the area. And it connects Karimnagar district with Mulugu and  Bhupalpally districts.

Railway 
Kamalapur has a railway station – Uppal railway station, that is preceding major station the Kazipet Junction on Nagpur–Hyderabad rail line

References 

Hanamkonda district